Eugene James Williams (born April 1, 1947) is an American former professional basketball player.

He played college basketball for Kansas State from 1967 to 1969 and was All-Big Eight Conference second team selection in his senior year.

Williams had been selected by the Kentucky Colonels in the third round of the 1969 ABA Draft and by the Phoenix Suns in the second round of the 1969 NBA Draft. He signed with the Suns during the summer. In October, the Suns assigned him to the Eastern League. On November 12, he signed with the Colonels after they bought out his contract with the Suns. Less than 10-days later, he was waived by the Colonels after appearing in one game.

References

1947 births
Living people
American men's basketball players
Basketball players from San Francisco
City College of San Francisco Rams men's basketball players
Kansas State Wildcats men's basketball players
Kentucky Colonels draft picks
Kentucky Colonels players
Phoenix Suns draft picks